The  is an obstacle on many obstacle courses for obstacle racing.

Use

Ninjasport
The warped wall is used in various Ninja Warrior franchises, such as Sasuke, Kunoichi, American Ninja Warrior, Team Ninja Warrior, Ninja Warrior UK, Sasuke Ninja Warrior Indonesia, and Australian Ninja Warrior. The height of the warped wall varies depending on the competition. American Ninja Warrior used a  warped wall for its first seven seasons, before switching to a  wall in season 8. American Ninja Warrior also uses a "mega wall" for its all-star skills competition, where the height of the wall increases until no one can climb it. For its 2018 season 10, American Ninja Warrior introduced a  "mega warped wall". If they are successful in climbing it, they would win $10,000. Competitors who chose the mega warped wall had only one attempt to reach the top. If unsuccessful, the competitor only got one shot at the warped wall. Those who did not wish to attempt the mega wall had three chances to reach the top of the warped wall. The mega wall will only be featured in the city qualifiers. In season 11, they had three attempts at both walls. The amount for making it up the warped wall decreased with every attempt, starting at $10,000 for the first, $5,000 for the second, and $2,500 for the third. In American Ninja Warrior Junior, the warped wall measures , and will be completed at that height by the 13-14-year-olds. The unique wall is equipped with two pocket levels, which will provide assistance to the other age groups. 9-10-year-olds have a pocket at 10 feet. 11-12-year-olds have a pocket at 11.5 feet.

Obstacle racing
Several obstacle course races, including Rugged Maniac and Tough Mudder, have featured a similar wall albeit often with assistance available via ropes or teamwork. Some obstacle training gyms also offer a warped wall for practice.

Playgrounds and gyms
Many playgrounds and amusement gyms feature a Warped Wall. City Museum, a playground and museum consisting largely of repurposed architectural and industrial objects, housed in a former warehouse in St. Louis, includes a Warped Wall as well.

Many workout and training gyms feature a Warped Wall training station.

Construction
The warped wall is a steeply curving tall wall obstacle with a short run-up, that the competitor must reach the top of and climb up.

Several manufacturers of warped walls exist to provide gyms and private individuals with this obstacle.

Competition

Ninjasport

Women in American Ninja Warrior
On American Ninja Warrior, there have been thirty women who have scaled the Warped Wall in Seasons 6-14. During Season 11, Sandy Zimmerman became the first mom televised to climb the Warped Wall.

References

Obstacle racing